James Pinnock is an English footballer.

Career
Pinnock came through the ranks at his local Football League side Gillingham, making 16 first team appearances in total. After loan spells at Margate, Dover Athletic and Chesham United, Pinnock moved permanently from Gillingham to Conference side Kingstonian where he spent two years before joining Gravesend & Northfleet.

Pinnock spent two years at 'The Fleet' before joining Welling United in 2005. Pinnock spent a year at Welling and then moved onto Margate for whom he had previously played for on loan. Pinnock had his most fruitful goalscoring spell while at Margate, averaging nearly a goal every two games in the league.

In the 2008 close season Pinnock made the short trip along the M2 to join Maidstone United. Pinnock stayed at Maidstone for nearly two years, however in March 2010 he and three other players controversially left the club to join Margate, meaning Pinnock was now playing in his third spell for the Thanet side.

In the summer of 2011 Pinnock rejoined recently relegated Maidstone United where he joined up with Jay Saunders who had recently been made player-manager of the club. Pinnock left the club in early 2012 after struggling to hold down a place in the first team.

References

Gillingham F.C. players
Margate F.C. players
Dover Athletic F.C. players
Maidstone United F.C. players
Welling United F.C. players
Ebbsfleet United F.C. players
Kingstonian F.C. players
Living people
1978 births
Association football forwards
Chesham United F.C. players
English footballers